The Completely Mental Misadventures of Ed Grimley is an American animated television series produced by Hanna-Barbera Productions and featuring Martin Short's fictional character Ed Grimley (with Short reprising his role as Grimley). The show aired on NBC from September 10 to December 3, 1988 for a single season of 13 episodes. The show is the only Saturday morning animated adaptation of both an SCTV character and a Saturday Night Live character, and the first Saturday morning cartoon featuring an SCTV cast member (later joined by Camp Candy, featuring John Candy, and Rick Moranis's Gravedale High).

Guest stars on the show included Christopher Guest and SCTV alumni Eugene Levy and Dave Thomas. The show also featured the voices of René Auberjonois, Kenneth Mars, and Arte Johnson. Though the show was not renewed for a second season, The Completely Mental Misadventures of Ed Grimley was later seen in reruns in 1996 on Cartoon Network's unnamed pre-Adult Swim-era late-night programming block, which consisted of such shows as Space Ghost Coast to Coast and reruns of classic Looney Tunes shorts and Hanna-Barbera programming, before it was rerun again on Boomerang. Hanna-Barbera sponsored an Ed Grimley look-alike contest midway through the first season, which was won by 10-year-old Matt Mitchell from Des Moines, Iowa.

Synopsis and characters
Episodes of the show often featured Ed Grimley in several adventures, which start out as mundane, but turn very surreal and cartoonish, interspersed with science lessons from The Amazing Gustav Brothers, Roger and Emil, and a live-action segment with a "scary story" titled The Count Floyd Show presented as a show-within-a-show by Grimley's favorite television host, SCTV'''s Count Floyd (played by SCTV cast member Joe Flaherty). Grimley's fellow cartoon characters included Grimley's landlord Leo Freebus (voiced by Jonathan Winters), Leo's wife Deidre (voiced by Andrea Martin), his ditzy, amateur actress neighbor Ms. Malone (voiced by Catherine O'Hara; a female character by the name of Ms. Malone did appear on an SNL version of an Ed Grimley sketch on the season ten episode hosted by Alex Karras, but Ms. Malone was played by that episode's musical guest Tina Turner), and her little brother Wendell (voiced by Danny Cooksey). Ed owns a goldfish named Moby and a clever pet rat named Sheldon (voiced by Frank Welker). At the end of each episode, Ed would write in his diary about what happened in his day.

Additional voices
 Charlie Adler
 René Auberjonois
 Michael Bell
 Susan Blu
 Hamilton Camp
 Danny Cooksey
 Robert Ito
 Arte Johnson
 Christina Lange
 Kenneth Mars
 Rob Paulsen
 Dave Thomas
 B.J. Ward
 Frank Welker

Episodes

Home media
On January 29, 2013, Warner Home Video (through the Warner Archive) released The Completely Mental Misadventures of Ed Grimley: The Complete Series on DVD in region 1 as part of their Hanna-Barbera Classics Collection. This is a Manufacture-on-Demand (MOD) release, available exclusively through Warner's online store, MoviesUnlimited.com, and Amazon.com. In addition, the episode "Tall, Dark & Hansom" is available on Warners' Saturday Morning Cartoons: 1980s Volume 1'' DVD set, released on May 4, 2010.

See also
 List of works produced by Hanna-Barbera Productions
 Recurring Saturday Night Live characters and sketches

References

External links
 

NBC original programming
1980s American animated television series
1980s American satirical television series
1988 American television series debuts
1988 American television series endings
American animated television spin-offs
American children's animated adventure television series
American children's animated comedy television series
Television series by Hanna-Barbera
English-language television shows
Animation based on real people